Lockville Dam, Canal and Powerhouse is a historic dam, canal, and powerhouse located near Moncure, Chatham County, North Carolina.  The dam was built in 1922 and replaced an earlier log dam built by the Cape Fear and Deep River Navigation Company.  The canal stone walls appear to date from the mid-1850s.  The powerhouse was built in 1922, and is a simple brick and concrete structure resting on a massive stone foundation.

It was listed on the National Register of Historic Places in 1984.

References

External links

Historic American Engineering Record in North Carolina
Canals on the National Register of Historic Places in North Carolina
Industrial buildings and structures on the National Register of Historic Places in North Carolina
Buildings and structures completed in 1855
Buildings and structures in Chatham County, North Carolina
National Register of Historic Places in Chatham County, North Carolina
Dams on the National Register of Historic Places in North Carolina